Ryan James Pryce (born 20 September 1986) is an English footballer who plays as a goalkeeper for Winchester City. He made five appearances in the English Football League for AFC Bournemouth.

Playing career

AFC Bournemouth
Pryce started his career with AFC Bournemouth and made his debut against Southend United when Bournemouth were 4–1 down. On 3 September 2009, Bournemouth announced that Pryce had left the club by mutual consent.

Search for a club
Pryce announced on 4 December 2009 he was in talks with Shrewsbury Town manager, Paul Simpson, over a coaching role at the club. This came after a number of different coaching roles with clubs throughout the Salisbury area. However, this came to nothing.

Salisbury City
Pryce was signed by Salisbury City to add cover for James Bittner in February 2010. He had to remain patient for the rest of the 2009–10 season, but this was rewarded with a contract extension at the end of the season.

The 2010–11 season saw Pryce in a constant battle for the number 1 shirt with fellow goalkeeper Tommy Smith. In October 2010, Pryce was loaned out to Gosport Borough to gain more first team experience.

Gosport Borough
During the summer of 2011, Pryce made his move to Gosport permanent.

Fleet Town
In November 2011, Pryce joined Southern Football League side Fleet Town, and made his debut against Northwood on 12 November in a 4–1 home defeat.

References

External links
Ryan Pryce player profile at afcb.co.uk

1989 births
Living people
English footballers
Association football goalkeepers
AFC Bournemouth players
Salisbury City F.C. players
Gosport Borough F.C. players
Fleet Town F.C. players
English Football League players
Footballers from Bournemouth